Top Chef Family Style is an American reality streaming television series and a spin-off of Bravo's Top Chef series. The show features young chefs teaming up with adult family members to compete in culinary challenges for a  prize. The series was ordered in May 2021 by streaming service Peacock. It is hosted by Meghan Trainor with Marcus Samuelsson serving as head judge. The series premiered on September 9, 2021, and concluded on December 2, 2021. In the season finale, niece and uncle Delilah and Daniel "Danny" Flores were declared the winners, with daughter and mother Anika and Anupama "Anu" Kumar placing as runners-up. In 2022, the second episode "Truffles, Caviar & Prawns -- Oh My!" received the James Beard Foundation Award for Reality or Competition Visual Media.

Contestants

Top Chef Family Style features 13 pairs of contestants, referred to as "duos". The cast includes the youngest and oldest competitors to appear in the Top Chef franchise.

Contestant progress

: The duo did not receive immunity for winning the Quickfire Challenge.
: In Episode 3, Brooke suffered from heat exhaustion during the Elimination Challenge, forcing her and Carol to withdraw from the competition.
: In Episodes 5, the judges decided not to eliminate any duos.
: In Episode 12, the judges did not declare a winner for the Elimination Challenge and all three duos advanced to the next round.
 (WINNER) The duo won the season.
 (RUNNER-UP) The duo was the runner-up for the season.
 (WIN) The duo won the Elimination Challenge.
 (HIGH) The duo was selected as one of the top entries in the Elimination Challenge, but did not win.
 (IN) The duo was not selected as one of the top or bottom entries in the Elimination Challenge and was safe.
 (LOW) The duo was selected as one of the bottom entries in the Elimination Challenge, but was not eliminated.
 (OUT) The duo lost the Elimination Challenge.
 (WDR) The duo voluntarily withdrew from the competition.

Episodes

References

External links

Top Chef
Peacock (streaming service) original programming
Cooking competitions in the United States
2020s American cooking television series
2020s American reality television series
2021 American television series debuts
2021 American television series endings
English-language television shows
Reality television spin-offs
American television spin-offs
Television series about families
Television series by Magical Elves